Joseph Anthony Mantegna (born November 13, 1947) is an American actor.

Mantegna began his career on stage in 1969 in the Chicago production of the musical Hair. He earned a Tony Award for Best Featured Actor in a Play and a Joseph Jefferson Award for portraying Richard Roma in the first American productions of David Mamet's Pulitzer Prize–winning play Glengarry Glen Ross, the first of many collaborations with Mamet. His long-standing association with Mamet includes the premieres of A Life in the Theatre, The Disappearance of the Jews and Speed-the-Plow on Broadway. Mantegna also directed a highly lauded production of Mamet's Lakeboat, which enjoyed a successful theatrical run in Los Angeles. He later directed the film version of Lakeboat. In addition to theatrical appearances directed by Mamet, Mantegna appeared in Mamet's films House of Games (1987), Things Change (1988), Homicide (1991), and Redbelt (2008).

In film and on television, Mantegna is best known for his roles in box office hits such as Three Amigos (1986), The Godfather Part III (1990), Forget Paris (1995), and Up Close and Personal (1996). He starred in the television series First Monday (2002) and Joan of Arcadia (2003–2005). He has earned Emmy Award nominations for his roles in three different miniseries: The Last Don (1997), The Rat Pack (1998), and The Starter Wife (2007). He has also served as executive producer for various movies and television movies, including Corduroy (1984), Hoods (1998), and Lakeboat (2000), which he also directed. Additionally, he played Robert B. Parker's fictional detective Spenser in three made-for-TV movies between 1999 and 2001, and has narrated a number of audiobook readings of the Spenser novels. From 2007 to 2020, he starred in the CBS television series Criminal Minds as FBI Supervisory Special Agent David Rossi. Beginning with the 1991 episode "Bart the Murderer", Mantegna has voiced the recurring role of mob boss Fat Tony on the animated series The Simpsons, as well as The Simpsons Movie (2007).

Early life
Mantegna was born on November 13, 1947, in Chicago to Italian American parents. His parents were Mary Ann (Novelli; 1916–2017), a shipping clerk from Acquaviva delle Fonti, Apulia, Italy, and Joseph Henry Mantegna, an insurance salesman from Calascibetta, Sicily, who died in 1971 of tuberculosis.

Mantegna was raised Catholic and attended J. Sterling Morton High School East in Cicero, Illinois. He graduated from Goodman School of Drama at the Art Institute of Chicago (now at DePaul University) in 1969.

As a young man in Chicago, he played bass in a band called The Apocryphals, which later played with another local group, The Missing Links, who went on to form the band Chicago. As of 2007, Mantegna remained very close to the original members of Chicago.

Mantegna started off in the film industry as a photographer, taking headshots.

Career

Mantegna made his acting debut in the Chicago production of the stage musical Hair (1969) and debuted on Broadway in Working (1978). He co-wrote Bleacher Bums, an award-winning play which was first performed at Chicago's Organic Theater Company, and was a member of its original cast. In the movie Xanadu (1980), he had a small role which was cut, although since his name is in the film's credits, Mantegna gets residuals for the film.

Mantegna won a Tony award for his portrayal of Richard Roma in David Mamet's play Glengarry Glen Ross. He has had a long and successful association with Mamet, appearing in a number of his works.

Mantegna made his feature film debut in Medusa Challenger (1977). He played womanizing dentist Bruce Fleckstein in Compromising Positions (1985). He starred in an episode of The Twilight Zone in 1985 called Shelter Skelter. His other early film roles were supporting performances in The Money Pit (1986), Weeds (1987) and Suspect (1987).

He also starred in the critically acclaimed movies House of Games (1987) and Things Change (1988), both written by Mamet. He and Things Change co-star Don Ameche received the Best Actor Award at the Venice Film Festival. In 1991, Mantegna starred in another Mamet story, the highly praised police thriller Homicide.

Mantegna has played a wide range of roles, from the comic, as a jaded disc jockey in Airheads and an inept kidnapper from Baby's Day Out, to the dramatic, in roles such as Joey Zasa, a treacherous mobster in The Godfather Part III (1990) and an Emmy-nominated performance as singer Dean Martin in HBO's film The Rat Pack (1998).

Mantegna has a recurring role in the animated series The Simpsons as the voice of mob boss Anthony "Fat Tony" D'Amico. He insists on voicing the character every time he appears, no matter how little dialogue he has. To quote Mantegna: "If Fat Tony sneezes, I want to be there." However, in one instance, Phil Hartman voiced Fat Tony in the episode "A Fish Called Selma".

Mantegna spoofed himself when he hosted Saturday Night Live for the 1990–1991 season in which he calmly began his monologue by saying he did not wish to be typecast from his gangster roles. A disappointed little boy and his father leave, as they mistakenly believed the host would be Joe Montana (the football player) due to the similar names. Mantegna then began speaking in a low, controlled voice to the little boy, telling him it was best to stay in the audience and respect his performance; he warned the boy that if he (Mantegna) made a call, then Montana would not play in his next game—an implication that Mantegna's true personality equaled his gangster roles.

In 2002, Mantegna starred as Associate Justice of the Supreme Court of the United States, Justice Joseph Novelli, on the CBS midseason replacement drama First Monday.

Mantegna received the Lifetime Achievement Award on April 26, 2004, at the Los Angeles Italian Film Festival.

On August 11, 2007, Mantegna signed on to replace departing star Mandy Patinkin on the CBS crime drama Criminal Minds. Starting with season 9, he also directed several episodes.

Mantegna is very close with all his co-stars on Criminal Minds but is especially close with Shemar Moore. He is said to act like a father figure for Moore.

Since 2006, he has co-narrated the National Memorial Day Concert on the Mall in Washington D.C. with Gary Sinise.

In 2016, he took part in an event at the Los Angeles County Museum of Art reading some of Gabriele Tinti's poems about Hercules.

Mantegna is said to have helped Verne Troyer get into the industry and presented him with the Media Access Award before his death.

Legacy
On April 29, 2011, Mantegna received the 2,438th star on the Hollywood Walk of Fame in Los Angeles. On June 6, 2011, Mantegna's hometown of Cicero, Illinois celebrated his body of work with an honorary street sign—Joe Mantegna Boulevard—on the northeast corner of Austin Boulevard and 25th Street, the location of his high school. In 2014, Mantegna received a star on the Italian Walk of Fame in Toronto. On May 3, 2017, the city of Chicago dedicated Joe Mantegna Way, a section of Armitage Avenue where Mantegna lived during his early acting days.

On April 4, 2015, Mantegna received a Lifetime Achievement Award for Film and Television from The Riverside International Film Festival. On May 22, 2015, Mantegna received the Saint Pio Award from the Saint Pio Foundation, in recognition of his outstanding contribution in being an extraordinary individual in "providing relief from suffering to those in need".

An avid firearms enthusiast, he is the host of MidwayUSA's Gun Stories on the cable television Outdoor Channel.

Personal life
Mantegna married Arlene Vrhel on October 3, 1975. He said in an interview on The Talk that the 300th episode of Criminal Minds aired on October 3, 2018, their 43rd wedding anniversary, and he apologized during that interview for working on their anniversary.

They have two daughters: Mia and Gia. Arlene owned a Chicago-themed restaurant in Burbank, California, named Taste Chicago, which closed on March 22, 2019, for personal reasons. Mia, born 1987, is autistic and works as a make-up artist. She has also appeared with her father on KCAL-TV in support of Autism Awareness Month (April). Gina was born in 1990 and changed her name to Gia at age eighteen.

Mantegna is a Chicago Cubs fan and has led the singing of "Take Me Out to the Ball Game" during the 7th inning stretch multiple times. This was referenced in the show Criminal Minds where his character David Rossi's office is decked with Cubs gear.

In 1988, during the play Speed the Plow, Mantegna was stricken with Bell's Palsy. Although considered temporary, Mantegna still has persistent facial characteristics of the disease.

Filmography

Film

Television

As a director

Theater

See also
List of people with Bell's palsy

References

External links

 
 
 
 
 

1947 births
Living people
20th-century American male actors
21st-century American male actors
American male film actors
American male stage actors
American male television actors
American male voice actors
American people of Italian descent
Autism activists
DePaul University alumni
Male actors from Chicago
People from Cicero, Illinois
Tony Award winners
Volpi Cup for Best Actor winners